Birkelund is a surname. Notable people with the surname include:

Eirik Birkelund (born 1994), Norwegian footballer
Jan Birkelund (1950–1983), Norwegian footballer
Karina Birkelund (born 1980), Norwegian alpine skier
Olivia Birkelund (born 1963), American actress
Therese Birkelund Ulvo (born 1982), Norwegian composer and producer
Tove Birkelund (1928=1986), Danish historical geologist